À Paris may refer to:

À Paris, album by Nana Mouskouri
Live à Paris (video)
KUKL à Paris 14.9.84 a live album released by the Icelandic post-punk group Kukl in July 1985
 Live à Paris (Celine Dion album)

See also
Live in Paris (disambiguation)